Villinki is an island and a subdistrict of Helsinki, Finland.

Neighbourhoods of Helsinki